Hans Leinberger, sometimes given as Lemberger (c.1475/1480 – after 1531) was a Late Gothic sculptor from Altbayern, who worked in wood, metal and stone.

Life and work 
His exact birthplace is unknown, as is the place and manner of his artistic education. The first documented reference to him involves his residency in Landshut in 1510. The location of his workshop there remains a matter of speculation. After 1516, he did work for Louis X, Duke of Bavaria, who lived there while he was co-regent with his brother William IV. Wage receipts from 1529/30 indicate that he probably held a position similar to an official court artist. None of the works he created in that capacity appear to have survived.

He may have been the brother of Georg Lemberger, a painter and woodcut artist who also lived in Landshut, but the relationship is unclear.

His fame today rests largely upon the high altar at the Church of Saint Castulus in Moosburg an der Isar. Completed in 1514, it is the largest surviving altarpiece in Altbayern (although it was significantly modified in the 18th century by ).
That same year, he created a statue of Albert IV for the Hofkirche, Innsbruck from a drawing provided by Albrecht Dürer; a sign of the esteem in which he must have been held.

His later works include a Madonna for the Church of Saint Martin (1516/18) and a seated figure of Saint Judoc for his namesake church (c.1525) which is now in the Bayerisches Nationalmuseum. His last known works were altar figures for the Liebfrauenkirche in Polling, but only two (a Madonna and a Man of Sorrows) have survived.

References

Further reading 
 Georg Lill: Hans Leinberger. Der Bildschnitzer von Landshut. Welt und Umwelt des Künstlers. F. Bruckmann, Munich, 1942
 Hans Thoma: Hans Leinberger. Seine Stadt, seine Zeit, sein Werk. Friedrich Pustet, Regensburg 1979, 
 Um Leinberger. Schüler und Zeitgenossen. Museen der Stadt Landshut, Landshut 2007, 
 Heinz Dollinger: Hans Leinberger und die Herren von Plieningen. Hans Leinbergers Kleinbottwarer Altar von 1505. In: Alt und Jung Metten 72, 2006, ISSN 0949-8869
 Hans Dietl: "Die St.-Georgs-Kirche in Kleinbottwar - Meister des Altars: Hans Leinberger:"  In:Geschichtsblätter aus dem Bottwartal Vol.11, 2008, ISSN 0948-1532.

External links 

 
 

15th-century German sculptors
German male sculptors
16th-century German sculptors
People from Landshut
Renaissance sculptors
15th-century births
1530s deaths